Christmas Prayer is Aaron Neville's fourteenth studio album and his second Christmas album. It was released October 4, 2005. The album peaked at No. 3 on Billboard's Gospel chart, No. 14 on their Christian chart and at No. 74 on the R&B chart.

Critical reception

Thom Jurek of AllMusic writes, "Neville brings home the Christmas season and its good news origins with a quiet passion, a deep sense of reflection, and elegance."

Track listing

Track information and credits adapted from Discogs and AllMusic, then verified from the album's liner notes.

Charts

References

External links
Artist Official Site

Aaron Neville albums
2005 Christmas albums